The Leica M Monochrom (Typ 246) is a digital rangefinder camera manufactured by Leica Camera. It was released on 30 April 2015. The Leica M Monochrom (Typ 246) uses a full frame 24 Megapixels CMOS sensor that, like its predecessor the Leica M Monochrom, has no color filter array. It is therefore Leica's second black and white only camera. It is essentially a monochrome only version of the Leica M (Typ 240). The M Monochrom (Typ 246) offers an increase in ISO range up to ISO 25,000, a new 3 inches 921,000-dot LCD screen and live view shooting including focus peaking and 10x magnification. Also included is full HD video recording.

The Monochrom (Typ 246) is the successor of the Leica M Monochrom.

References

External links
  Review, user report, sample photos and manual for Leica Monochrom M246 by Thorsten Overgaard

M Monochrom
Digital rangefinder cameras
Cameras introduced in 2015